Each "article" in this category is a collection of entries about several stamp issuers, presented in alphabetical order. The entries are formulated on the micro model and so provide summary information about all known issuers.  

See the :Category:Compendium of postage stamp issuers page for details of the project.

Corrientes 

Dates 	1856 – 1878
Currency 	100 centavos = 1 peso fuerte

Refer 	Argentine Territories

Corsica 

Large island in the western Mediterranean, north of Sardinia.  First civilisation was established by Ionians
from Phocaea about 560 BC.  Invaded by various peoples until annexed by Genoa in the 14th century.
Due to constant rebellions, Genoa sold the island to France in 1768.  The following year, Napoleon Bonaparte
was born in Ajaccio and it was under his rule that Corsica finally accepted French nationality.
Corsica is now a French département.  It has used stamps of France only.

Capital 	Ajaccio

Refer 	France

Cos 

Refer 	Kos

Costa Rica 

Dates 	1863 –
Capital 	San José
Currency 	(1863) 8 reales = 1 peso
		(1881) 100 centavos = 1 peso
		(1901) 100 centavos = 1 colon

Main Article  Postage stamps and postal history of Costa Rica

See also 	Guanacaste

Council of Europe (Strasbourg) 

Dates 	1950 –
Currency 	100 centimes = 1 franc

Refer 	International Organisations

CPR Regional Issues 

Main Article  

Includes 	Central China (People's Post);
		East China (People's Post);
		North China (People's Post);
		North East China (People's Post);
		North West China (People's Post);
		Port Arthur & Dairen;
		Shensi-Kansu-Ninghsia;
		South China (People's Post);
		South West China (People's Post)

See also 	Chinese People's Republic

Cretan Revolutionary Assembly 

Stamps were issued by a rebel group led by Venizelos and based at Theriso, south of Khania.  The rebels
demanded union with Greece.  The revolt began in March and collapsed in Nov 1905.

Dates 	1905 only
Capital 	Theriso
Currency  	100 lepta = 1 drachma (Greek)

Refer 	Crete

Crete 

Crete was under Venetian rule to 1669 when it was conquered by the Ottoman Turks.  A long civil war developed
after 1840 which was only ended by a multi-power occupation (Britain, France, Italy and Russia) in 1898.
The island was declared an autonomous state in 1899 and was united with Greece by the Treaty of London
1913.

Cretan stamps were overprinted HELLAS in 1908–09 during a premature attempt by the local parliament to
declare union with Greece.  Greek stamps were imported in 1912 and were already in common use when union
was finally confirmed.

Dates 	1900 – 1913
Capital  	Kandia (now Herakleion)
Currency  	100 lepta = 1 drachma

Main Article  Postage stamps and postal history of Crete

Includes 	Cretan Revolutionary Assembly

Crete (Austro-Hungarian Post Offices) 

Overprinted Austrian stamps were in use at offices in Kandia, Khania and Rethymnon.  These offices
all closed on 15 December 1914.

Dates 	1903 – 1914
Currency  	100 centimes = 1 franc

Main Article  

See also: 	Austro–Hungarian Post Offices in the Turkish Empire

Crete (British Post Offices) 

Stamps inscribed in Greek were used in the British sphere of administration (Kandia) during the multi-power occupation.  Mail was forwarded via the Austrian office at Khania and surviving envelopes bear the stamps of both the British and Austrian agencies.  It is therefore uncertain if the British stamps had international validity.

Dates 	1898 – 1899
Currency  	40 paras = 1 piastre (Turkish)

Refer 	British Post Offices Abroad

Crete (Foreign Post Offices) 

Refer 	Crete (Austro–Hungarian Post Offices);
		Crete (British Post Offices);
		Crete (French Post Offices);
		Crete (Italian Post Offices);
		Crete (Russian Post Offices)

Crete (French Post Offices) 

France was one of the multi-power occupiers which ended the Cretan civil war in 1898–99.  They established
postal services in offices at Kandia, Khania, Hierapetra, Rethymnon and Sitea.  Standard French types were
issued with an inscription of CRETE.  All offices were closed in 1913.

Dates 	1902 – 1913
Currency 	(1902) 100 centimes = 1 franc
		(1903) 40 paras = 1 piastre

Main Article

Crete (Italian Post Offices) 

Refer 	Khania (Italian Post Office)

Crete (Russian Post Offices) 

Russia was one of the powers which occupied Crete in 1898.  It had a post office at Rethymnon within its
own sphere of administration.  The service operated for a short time only: from 13 May 1899 to 29 July 1899.
Four types were issued inscribed RETHYMNO with a total of 37 stamps.

Dates 	1899 only
Currency 	4 metallik = 1 grosion

Refer 	Russian Post Offices Abroad

Crimea 

Regional government issues.

Dates 	1918 – 1919
Capital 	Simferopol
Currency  	100 kopecks = 1 Russian ruble

Refer 	Russian Civil War Issues

Croatia 

Following the collapse of communism, Croatia declared its independence from Yugoslavia on 30 May 1991.
Serb inhabitants revolted with the backing of the Yugoslav army and fought a bitter aggressive war against
the Croatia.  In January 1992, a ceasefire became effective after the intervention of the UN
and the EEC.

In 1995, the Republic of Croatia began to recover its occupied territories.  The army liberated Western Slavonia
in May and areas of Banovina, Kordun, Lika and Dalmatia in August.  Both areas were reincorporated into the republic.  Eastern Slavonia
was placed under UN administration in November and called Sremsko Baranjska Oblast (Srem and Baranya
Region).  The administration lasted two years before Eastern Slavonia as a whole was reincorporated
back into the Republic of Croatia on 15 January 1998.

The Republic of Croatia began stamp issues after independence with the inscription REPUBLIKA HRVATSKA.

Dates 	1991 –
Capital 	Zagreb
Currency  	(1991) 100 paras = 1 dinar
		(1994) 100 lipa = 1 kuna

Main Article  Postage stamps and postal history of Croatia

Includes 	Croatia (Provincial Issues);
		Croatia (Semi–Autonomous State);
		Croatia (Yugoslav Regional Issue);
		Sremsko Baranjska Oblast (Croatia);
		Srpska Krajina (Croatia)

See also 	Yugoslavia

Croatia (Provincial Issues) 

Provincial issues were in use during 1918–21 prior to Croatia joining the Kingdom of Serbs Croats & Slovenes,
which became Yugoslavia in 1929.

Dates 	1918 – 1921
Currency  	(1918) 100 filler = 1 korona
		(1919) 100 heller = 1 krona

Refer 	Croatia

Croatia (Semi–Autonomous State) 

After the German conquest of Yugoslavia in 1941, Croatia was a semi-autonomous state with a puppet government
set up by the Nazis.  Croatia returned to Yugoslavia after WW2.

Dates 	1941 – 1945
Capital 	Zagreb
Currency  	(April 1941) 100 paras = 1 dinar
		(Sept 1941) 100 banicas = 1 kuna

Refer 	Croatia

Croatia (Yugoslav Regional Issue) 

Croatia returned to Yugoslavia after WW2 but there was another regional issue in 1945 due to a shortage of
Yugoslavia stamps at the time.

Dates 	1945 only
Capital 	Zagreb
Currency  	100 banicas = 1 kuna

Refer 	Croatia

Croatian Posts (Bosnia) 

When the Republic of Bosnia and Herzegovina was proclaimed from Sarajevo in March 1992, a civil war situation
escalated with Bosnian Serbs attempting to seize control of the country.

An immediate effect of the conflict was that the country split into three entities: Republika Srpska
(Bosnian Serb Republic), based at Pale, which declared allegiance to Serb-dominated Yugoslavia; the
Moslem-dominated "central government" based in Sarajevo; and a Croat administration based at Mostar.

The Mostar regime issued stamps inscribed BOSNA I HERCEGOVINA for four years.  Some issues referred
to Croatia itself.

When the Dayton Agreement was finalised in November 1995, the Mostar regime amalgamated with the Sarajevo
government to form the Federation of Bosnia and Herzegovina, while the Bosnian Serb Republic remained
separate.  Combined issues inscribed BOSNA I HERCEGOVINA have been issued since 1996.  In 1997, the currency
changed to 100 fennig = 1 mark.

Dates 	1992 – 1996
Capital 	Mostar
Currency  	(1992) 100 paras = 1 dinar
		(1994) 100 lipa = 1 kuna

Refer 	Bosnia & Herzegovina

Crozet 

Refer 	French Southern & Antarctic Territories

Cuba 

Cuba and Puerto Rico had joint issues 1855–72 when both were under Spanish colonial rule.  Cuba, though still a colony, had its own stamps 1873–99.  In 1899, colonial rule was ended and the island was under USA administration 1899–1902, but continued to issue its own stamps.  Cuba became independent in 1902.

Dates 	1873 –
Capital 	Havana
Currency  	(1873) 100 centimos = 1 peseta
		(1881) 100 centavos = 1 peso
		(1898) 100 cents = 1 dollar (USA)
		(1899) 100 centavos = 1 peso

Main Article  Postage stamps and postal history of Cuba

See also 	Cuba & Puerto Rico

Cuba & Puerto Rico 

Joint issues when both islands were under Spanish colonial rule.

Dates 	1855 – 1872
Currency  	(1855) 8.5 cuartos = 1 Spanish real
		(1866) 100 centimos = 1 peseta

See also 	Cuba;
		Puerto Rico

Cundinamarca 

Dates 	1870 – 1904
Currency  	100 centavos = 1 peso

Refer 	Colombian Territories

Curaçao (Curaçao and Dependencies)

Issued for the islands Aruba, Curaçao, Sint Maarten (which are now stamp issuers themselves) as well as Bonaire, Saba and Sint Eustatius (stamp issuer is the Netherlands as "Caribbean Netherlands"). After the name change in 1948, stamps have been inscribed Netherlands Antilles.

Dates 	1873 – 1948
Capital 	Willemstad
Currency  	100 cents = 1 gulden

Main Article  

See also 	Netherlands Antilles

Curaçao (island country)

Since 1948, stamps have been inscribed Netherlands Antilles.

Dates 	1873 – 1948
Capital 	Willemstad
Currency  	100 cents = 1 gulden

Main Article  Postage stamps and postal history of Curaçao

See also 	Netherlands Antilles

Cyprus 

Dates 	1880 –
Capital 	Nicosia
Currency  	(1880) 12 pence = 1 shilling; 20 shillings = 1 pound
		(1881) 40 paras = 1 piastre
		(1955) 1000 mils = 1 pound
		(1983) 100 cents = 1 pound

Main Article  Postage stamps and postal history of Cyprus

See also 	Turkish Cypriot Posts

Cyrenaica 

Became part of Libya in 1952.

Dates 	1923 – 1952
Capital  	Benghazi
Currency  	100 centesimi = 1 lira

Main Article  Postage stamps and postal history of Cyrenaica

Cyrenaica (British Occupation) 

Refer 	Middle East Forces (MEF)

Cythera 

Refer 	Ionian Islands

Czechoslovakia 

The federation was dissolved on 31 December 1992 with the formation of two independent states: Czech
Republic and Slovakia.

Dates 	1918 – 1939; 1945 – 1992
Capital 	Prague
Currency  	100 halířů (Hellers) = 1 Czechoslovak koruna

Main Article  Postage stamps and postal history of Czechoslovakia

See also 	Czech Republic;
		Siberia (Czechoslovak Army);
		Slovakia

Czech Republic 

Czechoslovakia was dissolved on 31 Dec 1992 when the Czech Republic and Slovakia became separate
states.  Stamps were issued soon afterwards with the inscription ČESKÁ REPUBLIKA.

Dates 	1993 –
Capital 	Prague
Currency  	100 halířů (Hellers) = 1 Czech koruna

Main Article  Postage stamps and postal history of the Czech Republic

See also 	Czechoslovakia;
		Slovakia

References

Bibliography
 Stanley Gibbons Ltd, Europe and Colonies 1970, Stanley Gibbons Ltd, 1969
 Stanley Gibbons Ltd, various catalogues
 Stuart Rossiter & John Flower, The Stamp Atlas, W H Smith, 1989
 XLCR Stamp Finder and Collector's Dictionary, Thomas Cliffe Ltd, c.1960

External links
 AskPhil – Glossary of Stamp Collecting Terms
 Encyclopaedia of Postal History

Corrientes